This is a list of diplomatic missions of the Syrian Arab Republic, not including honorary consulates.

Africa

 Algiers (Embassy)

 Cairo (Embassy)

 Nouakchott (Embassy)

 Lagos (Embassy)

 Dakar (Embassy)

 Pretoria (Embassy)

 Khartoum (Embassy)

 Dar es Salaam (Embassy)

Americas

 Buenos Aires (Embassy)

 Brasília (Embassy)
 São Paulo (Consulate-General)

 Santiago (Embassy)

 Havana (Embassy)

 Caracas (Embassy)

Asia

 Yerevan (Embassy)

 Beijing (Embassy)

 New Delhi (Embassy)

 Jakarta (Embassy)

 Tehran (Embassy)
 Isfahan (Consulate-General)

 Baghdad (Embassy)
 Mosul (Consulate-General)

 Tokyo (Embassy)

 Amman (Embassy)

 Beirut (Embassy)

Kuala Lumpur (Embassy)

 Pyongyang (Embassy)

 Islamabad (Embassy)
 Lahore (Consulate-General)
 Karachi (Consulate-General)

Europe

 Vienna (Embassy)

 Minsk (Embassy)

 Brussels (Embassy)

 Sofia (Embassy)

 Nicosia (Embassy)

 Prague (Embassy)

 Paris (Embassy)
 Marseille (Consulate-General)

 Berlin (Embassy)
 Hamburg (Consulate-General)

 Warsaw (Embassy)

 Bucharest (Embassy)

 Moscow (Embassy)

 Belgrade (Embassy)

 Madrid (Embassy)

 Stockholm (Embassy)

 Bern (Embassy)
 Geneva (Consulate-General)

Multilateral organisations
 Brussels (Former Mission to the European Union)
 Cairo (Former Permanent Mission to the Arab League)
 Geneva (Permanent Missions to the United Nations and other International Organizations)
 New York (Permanent Mission to the United Nations, also served as embassy of Syrian Arab Republic to United States)
 Paris (Permanent Missions to UNESCO)
 Rome (Permanent Mission to the Food and Agriculture Organization)
 Vienna (Permanent Mission to the United Nations)

Gallery

Non-resident diplomatic missions

See also
 Foreign relations of Syria
 Syrian passport

References

External links
Ministry of Foreign Affairs of Syria
Embassy of Syria in Canberra, Australia
Embassy of Syria in Ottawa, Canada
Embassy of Syria in London, United Kingdom
Embassy of Syria in KUALA LUMPUR, MALAYSIA

 
Diplomatic missions
Syria